van Pallandt is a surname. Notable people with the surname include:
 an aristocratic family from Germany.
Charlotte van Pallandt (1898-1997), Dutch painter and sculptor
Frederik, Baron van Pallandt (1934–1994), Dutch singer
Nina, Baroness van Pallandt (born 1932), Danish singer and actress
Philip baron van Pallandt (1889–1979), Dutch noble and Scoutmaster
Rudolph van Pallandt (1868–1913), Dutch sport shooter

Surnames of Dutch origin